Dos Hombres is a mezcal company co-founded in 2019 by American actors Aaron Paul and Bryan Cranston. The two are best known for playing lead characters Jesse Pinkman and Walter White, respectively, on the 2008-2013 crime drama series Breaking Bad. Dos Hombres means "two men" in Spanish.

In June 2021, Constellation Brands took a minority stake in Dos Hombres. The company made the investment through its venture capital group. Dos Hombres will continue to be independently owned and operated.

The company produces artisanal mezcal which is distilled in small batches and does not use modern technology. Dos Hombres is produced in San Luis del Río in Oaxaca, Mexico, and production is led by Gregorio Velasco.

Products
 Dos Hombres Espadin: It is made with Agave Espadin in San Luis del Rio, Oaxaca, Mexico. Its alcohol content percentage is 42%
 Dos Hombres Tobala: It is made with maguey tobala (Agave potatorum) in San Luis del Rio, Oaxaca, Mexico. The Tobala plants used in this batch were grown for almost 25 years. The product’s alcohol content percentage is 45%

Cocktails
 Dos Hombres Sour
 Dos Hombres Mule
 Party Punch
 Sunrise in Oaxaca

References

External links

Alcoholic drink brands
Mezcal
2019 establishments in Mexico
Food and drink companies established in 2019
Companies based in Oaxaca